Consorts of Romanian monarchs were persons married to the Romanian monarch during his reign. All monarchs of modern Romania were male with the title of King of the Romanians, but all Romanian consorts were women with the title of Queen of Romania and style Majesty, rather than Queen of the Romanians.  The following women were Queens of Romania as spouses of the kings of modern Romania between 1859 and 1947:

Princesses of the United Principalities

House of Cuza

House of Hohenzollern-Sigmaringen

Queens of Romania

House of Hohenzollern-Sigmaringen

Queens consort and Prince Consort of Romania (in pretence)

House of Romania

See also
List of consorts of Wallachia
List of consorts of Moldavia
List of consorts of Transylvania

Romania, Queen Consorts of
Romania, Princess Consorts of
 
Romania, List of royal consorts of